Ramche may refer to:

Ramche, Myagdi, Nepal
Ramche, Rasuwa, Nepal
Ramche, Sindhupalchok, Nepal